was a coastal town located at the mouth of the Kozagawa river in Higashimuro District, Wakayama Prefecture, Japan.

As of 2003, the town has an estimated population of 5,587 and a density of 121.43 persons per km². The total area is 46.01 km².

On April 1, 2005, Koza was merged into the expanded town of Kushimoto (formerly from Nishimuro District, now within Higashimuro District).

External links
Official town website (in Japanese)
Photographs/Images of Koza in 2005/2006 from Wakawaka Studios

Dissolved municipalities of Wakayama Prefecture
Kushimoto, Wakayama